The Myponga-Sellicks Football Club is an Australian rules football club first formed on 25 March 1946 as the Myponga Football Club.  Myponga started in the Southern Football Association that season where it remained until the end of the 1966 season, when they transferred to the Great Southern Football League.

In 2003, Myponga changed its name to the Myponga-Sellicks Football Club to expand its catchment area.

Myponga-Sellicks continue to field Senior and Junior teams in the Great Southern Football League.

A-Grade Premierships 
 Southern Football Association A-Grade (3)
 1953, 1957, 1960
 Great Southern Football League A-Grade (3)
 1974, 1983, 1984

Other Achievements 
In 1953, Myponga won the "Cock of the South" title by, as Southern premiers, beating the Great Southern premiers, Goolwa, to decide the best team in the region.

Greatest SFL Team 
To celebrate the 125th anniversary of the Southern Football League, each club was asked to name their "Greatest Team" whilst participating in the SFL.

References

External links 
 Facebook page

Australian rules football clubs in South Australia
1946 establishments in Australia
Australian rules football clubs established in 1946